Hotstylz  is an American hip hop group from Chicago, Illinois, formed in 2007. The trio, composed of Midwest rappers Krazee, Meatball and Raydio G, is signed to fellow American rapper Yung Joc's Swagg Team, distributed by Jive/RCA Records. In late 2007 they released their debut single titled "Lookin Boy", which features Yung Joc and peaked at #47 on the US Billboard Hot 100.

Each member of Hotstylz works as solo artist, but they come together to form the group Hotstylz. The current rappers of the group are Raydio G (Raymond Jones), Krazee (Kryss Johnson), and Meatball (Garren Hodge). In Fall 2011, they released a mixtape entitled "Where Yall Been At".

Despite being active since mid 2007, the group has yet to release a full album and had only released two mixtapes.

Controversy
In 2013, Detroit-based rapper Eminem sampled "Lookin' Boy", for his 2013 hit single, "Rap God".The group claims Eminem did not receive permission to use the sample, nor did he credit or compensate them. In November 2013, Hotstylz released a diss track towards Eminem titled "Rap Fraud", where they sample several of his songs and criticize him for not crediting them. In January 2015, TMZ reported Hotstylz were suing Eminem and Shady Records for the amount of $8 million for using the 6-second sample of "Lookin' Boy" on his song "Rap God" without their permission.

Discography

Mixtapes 
 A.D.D. (2009)
 Where Y'all Been At (2011)
 We Back (2016)

Singles

References

External links
Hotstylz's Myspace

Jive Records artists
Midwest hip hop groups
Musical groups from Chicago
African-American musical groups
American hip hop groups
Musical groups established in 2007
Rappers from Chicago
American musical trios